The Achievement School District (ASD) is a school system in Tennessee providing academic intervention in the lowest performing schools in Tennessee, with the goal of increasing student achievement in those schools.  The ASD's assigned task is to move the bottom 5% of schools in Tennessee to the top 25% of schools in the state. The Achievement School District was created to cause "school turnaround," a term meaning rapid results in poorer performing schools. The Achievement School District is modeled after the Louisiana Recovery School District and takes elements from the Michigan School District as well.

History
Tennessee received funding from the federal government to create the Achievement School District when it won Race to the Top, a United States Department of Education contest created to spur innovation and reforms in state and local district K-12 education. The Achievement School District was created to improve student achievement in Tennessee's Priority Schools—those in the bottom 5% in the state—and in so doing, increasing students' career options and life outcomes. It is modeled from principles of President Bush's No Child Left Behind Act of 2001 and Obama's Race to the top legislation. Various states submit their budget proposals in order to receive financial support. Schools in desperate need of change are labelled as priority schools. Those priority schools are added into this school district with the goal to be eventually released back into city and state school systems. They acquire staff from programs such as the Memphis Teacher Residency and Teach for America.

Leadership
Malika Anderson was named the superintendent of the Achievement School District in November 2015 by the Tennessee Department of Education. She was preceded by Chris Barbic, who served in the role from 2011 to 2015.The district depends on CMO's or charter management organizations in order to run and fund these charter schools. These CMO's come from various sources such as the state, national organizations, and financial donors. The Achievement School District creates autonomy for these schools to launch the programs they need.

ASD Schools
The bottom 5% of Tennessee schools include 83 schools across Memphis, Jackson, Nashville, Knoxville and Chattanooga.   As of August 2016, there are 31 schools serving 12,000 students in the ASD.

School Operators
Achievement Schools

Aspire Public Schools

Capstone Education Group

Frayser Community Schools

Freedom Preparatory Academy

Gestalt Community Schools

Green Dot Public Schools

KIPP Memphis Collegiate Schools

LEAD Public Schools

Libertas School of Memphis

Memphis Scholars

Project GRAD

Pathways in Education

Promise Academy

Rocketship Education

References

Public education in Tennessee